Block N Load is a team-based first-person shooter and voxel-based sandbox video game developed and published by Jagex in conjunction with Artplant. A successor to Ace of Spades, the game was released as a free-to-play title on 30 April 2015.

Reception 
Block N Load was released on 30 April 2015 to mixed reviews, according to review aggregator Metacritic.

References

External links 
 

2015 video games
Artplant games
First-person shooter multiplayer online games
Multiplayer video games
Video games developed in the United Kingdom
Video games with Steam Workshop support
Video games with voxel graphics
Windows games
Windows-only games